is a Japanese neuroscientist who was born in Aichi and grew up in Tokyo. He leads a research group at the RIKEN Brain Science Institute, Japan.

Education and research history 
Hayashi completed an MD at the Faculty of Medicine at Kyoto University from 1984 to 1990, and continued with his PhD at the faculty's Institute for Immunology and Department of Pharmacology from 1990 to 1994. From 1994 to 1996 he was a Postdoctoral Fellow at the Department of Neurophysiology of the Institute for Brain Research at the Faculty of Medicine in the University of Tokyo, then in Cold Spring Harbor Laboratory from 1996 to 2000.

From 2000 to 2009 he was Assistant Professor (joint) at the RIKEN-MIT Neuroscience Research Center, at the Picower Institute for Learning and Memory, Department of Brain and Cognitive Sciences, Massachusetts Institute of Technology, and also, during the same period, the Senior Scientist (joint) at RIKEN's Brain Science Institute, becoming Unit Leader (joint) in 2004. In 2009 he became the team leader at the institute.

Awards and honors 
In 1998, Hayashi received the Young Investigator Award from the Japanese Pharmacological Society. In 2008 he received both the JSPS Prize for Young Investigators, and the Japan Academy Medal

References

External links 
 Massachusetts Institute of Technology
 The Picower Institute for Learning and Memory
 RIKEN
 RIKEN Brain Science Institute
 Laboratory Webpage

Japanese neuroscientists
1965 births
Living people
Riken personnel